The Moclips River is a river in the U.S. state of Washington. Its main tributary, the North Fork Moclips River, is longer than the main stem.

Course
Both the Moclips River and its main tributary, the North Fork Moclips River, originate on the slopes of Macafee Hill. Both flow generally west. The Moclips River empties into the Pacific near Moclips.

History
According to Edmond S. Meany the word moclips comes from a Quinault word meaning a place where girls were sent as they were approaching puberty. However, according to William Bright, the name comes from the Quinault word meaning, simply, "large stream".

See also
 List of rivers of Washington

References

External links

Rivers of Washington (state)
Rivers of Grays Harbor County, Washington